Alex Barré-Boulet (born May 21, 1997) is a Canadian professional ice hockey forward currently playing for the Syracuse Crunch in the American Hockey League (AHL) while under contract with the Tampa Bay Lightning of the National Hockey League (NHL).

Playing career

Junior
Barré-Boulet played in his native Quebec, at the midget level with the Rive-Sud Express Midget Espoir and Lévis Commandeurs. He was a late round draft pick to the Drummondville Voltigeurs, 102nd overall in the 2013 Quebec Major Junior Hockey League Entry Draft. Developing early as an offensive under-sized forward, Barré-Boulet lead the Voltigeurs with 54 assists, placing second in team scoring with 89 in just his second season in the QMJHL in 2015–16.

During his third season in the QMJHL in 2016–17, Barré-Boulet was traded by the Voltigeurs to Blainville-Boisbriand Armada in exchange for two players and three draft selections on January 6, 2017. In scoring at a greater than point-per-game pace with Armada, Barré-Boulet recorded 14 goals to lead the league in goals in the playoffs.

Undrafted, Barré-Boulet was leading the team and league in scoring in the 2017–18 season, when he secured a three-year, entry-level contract with the Tampa Bay Lightning on March 1, 2018. He finished the season recording a league-leading 53 goals and 63 assists for 116 points in 65 games to claim the Jean Béliveau Trophy. Voted as the League's MVP, capturing the Michel Brière Memorial Trophy, Barré-Boulet helped league leading Armada advance to the QMJHL finals, falling short in the President's Cup final against Acadie–Bathurst Titan.

Professional
Having ended his junior career, Barré-Boulet attended the Tampa Bay Lightning's rookie and main training camp, before he was reassigned to AHL affiliate the Syracuse Crunch to begin the 2018–19 season. Barré-Boulet scored the game-winning goal in his professional debut on October 6 and went on to be the top-scoring rookie in the AHL during the regular season with 68 points in 74 games for the Crunch, placing sixth in the league's overall scoring race. He earned a share of the Willie Marshall Award as the league co-leader with 34 goals, alongside teammate Carter Verhaeghe. He won the AHL's Dudley "Red" Garrett Memorial Award as the league's most outstanding rookie. He was an all-star during the 2019–20 season, putting up 40 points in 43 games before the All-Star break.

He recorded his professional hat trick on February 28, 2020, against the Wilkes-Barre/Scranton Penguins. The Crunch won the game, 4–3, and Barré-Boulet scored the first three Crunch goals.

Barré-Boulet was one of the eight players called up to the Lightning for their training camp prior to the 2020 Stanley Cup playoffs.

On February 22, 2021, Barré-Boulet skated in his first career NHL game in a 4–2 Lightning win over the Carolina Hurricanes at PNC Arena. On April 25, 2021, Barré-Boulet recorded his first career NHL goal and point in a 4–3 Lightning overtime win over the visiting Columbus Blue Jackets at Amalie Arena.

On October 10, 2021, he was placed on waivers by the Tampa Bay Lightning, and was claimed by the Seattle Kraken the next day. He played 2 games for Seattle recording 1 assist before, on October 21, he was placed on waivers by the Kraken, and was reclaimed by the Lightning the next day.

Personal life
Barré-Boulet's wife, Anne-Marie, gave birth to their first son, Zack, on February 16, 2022.

Career statistics

Awards & honours

References

External links
 

1997 births
Living people
Blainville-Boisbriand Armada players
Canadian ice hockey centres
Drummondville Voltigeurs players
Seattle Kraken players
Syracuse Crunch players
Tampa Bay Lightning players
Undrafted National Hockey League players
People from Montmagny, Quebec